Khari Thomas Blasingame (born July 1, 1996) is an American football fullback for the Chicago Bears of the National Football League (NFL). He played college football at Vanderbilt, and was signed as an undrafted free agent by the Minnesota Vikings in 2019.

High school career
Blasingame was a two-year captain and two-way starter at safety and running back for Buckhorn High School in Huntsville, Alabama. In his senior year, Blasingame posted 64 tackles, two interceptions, 966 rushing yards, and 10 touchdowns. As a three-star safety, Blasingame committed to Vanderbilt. He also received offers from Minnesota and Northwestern.

College career
Blasingame signed with Vanderbilt as a linebacker in 2015. He started seven games in his freshman year, and recorded 12 total tackles. He switched positions to halfback, the position he had played in high school, and he did significantly better. Blasingame started 13 games, carried the ball 97 times for 446 yards and 10 touchdowns. He was significantly better at running than catching, though, as he only got four receptions for eight yards. In his junior year, he was not the full-time starter, only starting 10 games. He carried the ball half as much that season, rushing 45 times for a very low 147 yards and no touchdowns. His only touchdown in 2017 was a reception, one of the six that season, as well as recording 52 total receiving yards. In his senior year, Blasingame settled into becoming the full-time starter, taking 96 carries for 400 yards and five touchdowns, as well as catching significantly more balls, racking up 25 catches for 320 yards and a touchdown.

In 2019, Blasingame was named the Arthur Ashe Jr. Male Sports Scholar by Diverse: Issues In Higher Education.

Professional career

Minnesota Vikings
After going undrafted, the Minnesota Vikings signed Blasingame as an undrafted free agent on May 3, 2019. He was waived on August 31, 2019, and was signed to the practice squad the next day.

Tennessee Titans

On November 13, 2019, the Tennessee Titans signed Blasingame to their active roster off the Vikings practice squad. In Week 14, Blasingame caught two passes for 47 yards against the Oakland Raiders.

Blasingame was placed on the reserve/COVID-19 list by the team on October 4, 2020, and was activated from the list on October 16.

Blasingame signed a one-year contract extension with the Titans on March 5, 2021. He was placed on injured reserve on November 6, 2021. He was activated on November 27.

Chicago Bears
On March 22, 2022, Blasingame signed a one-year contract with the Chicago Bears. He signed a two-year contract extension on March 8, 2023.

References

External links
Chicago Bears bio
Vanderbilt Commodores bio

1996 births
Living people
American football fullbacks
Vanderbilt Commodores football players
Sportspeople from Huntsville, Alabama
Players of American football from Alabama
Tennessee Titans players
Chicago Bears players